Bulgarian may refer to:

 Something of, from, or related to the country of Bulgaria
 Bulgarians, a South Slavic ethnic group
 Bulgarian language, a Slavic language
 Bulgarian alphabet
 A citizen of Bulgaria, see Demographics of Bulgaria 
 Bulgarian culture
 Bulgarian cuisine, a representative of the cuisine of Southeastern Europe

See also 
 
 List of Bulgarians, include
 Bulgarian name, names of Bulgarians
 Bulgarian umbrella, an umbrella with a hidden pneumatic mechanism
 Bulgar (disambiguation)
 Bulgarian-Serbian War (disambiguation)

Language and nationality disambiguation pages